Mestranol/norethisterone (brand names Norethin, Noriday, Norinyl, Norquen, Ortho-Novum, others) is a combination of the estrogen ethinylestradiol and the progestin norethisterone (norethindrone) which was introduced in 1963 and was the second combined oral contraceptive to be marketed, following mestranol/noretynodrel in 1960. Although most mestranol-containing oral contraceptive formulations have been discontinued, the combination remains available today in the United States in a single formulation under the brand name Norinyl 1+50 28-Day. It has largely been superseded by ethinylestradiol/norethisterone, which has been marketed under many of the same brand names.

See also
 Birth control pill formulations
 List of combined sex-hormonal preparations

References

Combined oral contraceptives